The 1973–74 WHL season was the 22nd and final season of the Western Hockey League. The Phoenix Roadrunners were the President's Cup champions as they beat the Portland Buckaroos in five games in the final series.

Final Standings 

bold - qualified for playoffs

Playoffs 

The Phoenix Roadrunners win the President's Cup 4 games to 1.

Player statistics

Scoring leaders
Note: GP = Games played, G = Goals, A = Assists, Pts = Points

Awards

References 

Western Hockey League (1952–1974) seasons
1973–74 in American ice hockey by league